Austin Davis Warren (born February 5, 1996) is an American professional baseball pitcher in the Los Angeles Angels organization. He made his MLB debut in 2021.

Amateur career
Warren attended Terry Sanford High School in Fayetteville, North Carolina. In addition to being a starter, Warren also posted a .387 batting average with 55 RBIs throughout his high school career. After graduating high school, Warren spent two seasons at Wake Technical Community College as a pitcher and middle infielder. As a sophomore, he posted a .302 batting average with 14 RBIs, while also putting up a 2.69 ERA over 67 innings on the mound. Warren transferred to University of North Carolina Wilmington after his sophomore year. In his junior year, he went 2-5 with a 6.51 ERA and 52 strikeouts in 47 innings pitched. In his senior year, Warren went 8-0 with a 1.11 ERA in a team-high 28 appearances. The Seahawks would go on to win the Colonial Athletic Association tournament title that year.

Professional career
In the 2018 MLB draft, Warren was selected by the Los Angeles Angels in the sixth round with the 181st pick overall. He began his 2018 season with the Orem Owlz, later finishing with the single-A Burlington Bees. Warren was promoted to the Low-A Inland Empire 66ers to begin 2019, later finishing with the Double-A Mobile BayBears. Warren did not pitch in 2020 due to the cancellation of the minor league season caused by the COVID-19 pandemic. He began his 2021 season with the Triple-A Salt Lake Bees. In 36.1 innings, Warren posted a 6.19 ERA, striking out 27.1% of opposing hitters with a 10.8% walk rate.

Los Angeles Angels
Warren was called up to the majors for the first time on July 28, 2021. He made his debut the following night, pitching 1.1 scoreless innings in relief against the Oakland Athletics. On August 6, 2021, Warren picked up his first major league win against the Los Angeles Dodgers, pitching 2.1 scoreless innings. He was designated for assignment on January 9, 2023. On January 13, he was sent outright to Triple-A Salt Lake.

References

External links

1996 births
Living people
Sportspeople from Fayetteville, North Carolina
Baseball players from North Carolina
Major League Baseball pitchers
Los Angeles Angels players
UNC Wilmington Seahawks baseball players
Burlington Bees players
Orem Owlz players
Mobile BayBears players
Inland Empire 66ers of San Bernardino players
Mesa Solar Sox players
Salt Lake Bees players